The women's trampoline competition at the 2015 European Games was held at the National Gymnastics Arena on 17 and 21 June 2015.

Qualification
The top six gymnasts with one per country advanced to the final.

Final

References 

Women's trampoline